The Essex class was a class of aircraft carriers of the United States Navy. The 20th century's most numerous class of capital ship, the class consisted of 24 vessels, which came in "short-hull" and "long-hull" versions. Thirty-two ships were ordered, but as World War II wound down, six were canceled before construction, and two were canceled after construction had begun. Fourteen saw combat during World War II. None were lost to enemy action, though several sustained crippling damage. Essex-class carriers were the backbone of the U.S. Navy from mid-1943 and, with the three  carriers added just after the war, continued to be the heart of U.S. naval strength until supercarriers joined the fleet in the 1950s, 1960s and 1970s. Several of the carriers were rebuilt to handle heavier and faster aircraft of the early jet age, and some served until well after the Vietnam War.

Overview
The preceding s and the designers' list of trade-offs and limitations forced by arms control treaty obligations shaped the development of the Essex class – a design sparked by the Japanese and Italian repudiation of the limitations proposed in the 1936 revision of the Washington Naval Treaty of 1922 (as updated in October 1930 in the London Naval Treaty).  Effectively, this rejection allowed all five signatories to resume the interrupted naval arms race of the 1920s in early 1937.

At the time of the repudiations, both Italy and Japan had colonial ambitions, intent on or already conducting military conquests.  With the demise of the treaty limitations and the growing tensions in Europe, naval planners were free to apply both the lessons they had learned operating carriers for fifteen years and those of operating the Yorktown-class carriers to the newer design.

Designed to carry a larger air group, and unencumbered by the latest in a succession of pre-war naval treaty limits,  was over sixty feet longer, nearly ten feet wider, and more than a third heavier. A longer, wider flight deck and a deck-edge elevator (which had proven successful in the one-off ) facilitated more efficient aviation operations, enhancing the ship's offensive and defensive air power.

Machinery arrangement and armor protection were greatly improved from previous designs. These features, plus the provision of more anti-aircraft guns, gave the ships much enhanced survivability.

Debates raged regarding armoring the hangar deck. British designers' comments tended to disparage the use of hangar deck armor, but some historians, such as D.K. Brown in Nelson to Vanguard, see the American arrangement to have been superior. In the late 1930s, locating the strength deck at hangar deck level in the proposed Essex-class ships reduced the weight located high in the ship, resulting in smaller supporting structures and more aircraft capacity for the desired displacement. The  which followed armored both the hangar and flight deck (the latter more heavily).

The larger size of the first supercarriers necessitated a deeper hull and shifted the center of gravity and center of stability lower, enabling moving the strength deck to the flight deck, thus freeing US Naval design architects to move the armor higher and remain within compliance of US Navy stability specifications without imperiling seaworthiness. One of the design studies prepared for the Essex project, "Design 9G", included an armored flight deck but reduced aircraft capacity, and displaced 27,200 tons, or about 1,200 tons more than "Design 9F", which formed the basis of the actual Essex design; 9G became the ancestor of the 45,000-ton Midway class.

Development

After the abrogation of disarmament treaties by Japan in 1936, the U.S. took a realistic look at its naval strength. With the Naval Expansion Act of Congress passed on 17 May 1938, an increase of 40,000 tons in aircraft carriers was authorized.

The Navy ordered the first three of the new design, CV-9, CV-10 and CV-11, from Newport News Shipbuilding & Drydock on 3 July 1940. These were to become known as Essex-class carriers. Under the terms of the Two-Ocean Navy Act, eight more of these carriers were programmed. Eight were ordered on 9 September, CV-12 through −15 from Newport News, and CV-16 through −19 from Bethlehem Steel's Fore River Shipyard; the last two, CV-20 and CV-21, were authorized 23 December 1941, with the primary intention of keeping existing slipways busy, and were ordered eight days after Pearl Harbor from the Brooklyn Navy Yard and Newport News respectively.

After the US declaration of war, Congress appropriated funds for nineteen more Essex-class carriers. Ten were ordered in August 1942 (CV-31 and 33-35 from Brooklyn, CV-32 from Newport News, CV-36 and -37 from the Philadelphia Navy Yard, CV-38 through -40 from the Norfolk Navy Yard) and three more in June 1943 (CV-45 from Philadelphia, -46 from Newport News and -47 from Fore River). Only two of these were completed in time to see active World War II service. Six ships ordered in 1944 (CV-50 through -55) were canceled before construction was begun.

The Essex-class carriers combined the policy of naming aircraft carriers after historic battles begun with the Lexington class with the policy of naming them for historic navy ships generally followed for the Yorktown class.  The first eight hulls were originally assigned names from historic Navy ships (Essex, Bon Homme Richard, Intrepid, Kearsarge, Franklin, Hancock, Randolph, Cabot).  was originally laid down as Cabot, but was renamed during construction after the previous  was lost in the Battle of the Coral Sea in May 1942. , originally to be named Bon Homme Richard, was renamed after the previous  was lost at the Battle of Midway on 7 June 1942. Lexington and Yorktown share the unique distinction of being named after both historic ships and historic battles.

Likewise, 's name was changed from Oriskany after the original  was sunk in September 1942 in the South Pacific near Guadalcanal, and 's name was changed from Kearsarge after the original  was lost in October 1942 in the Battle of Santa Cruz Islands. The erstwhile Valley Forge was renamed  after  was sunk in the Battle of Leyte Gulf in October 1944. USS Shangri-La was named after a facetious remark by President Franklin Delano Roosevelt suggesting that the Doolittle Raiders flew from the fictional Himalayan kingdom setting of the novel Lost Horizon.

At the conclusion of the war, the six ships ordered but never laid down (CV-50 through 55) were canceled. In summary, during World War II and until its conclusion, the US Navy ordered 32 aircraft carriers of the Essex class, including the Ticonderoga subgroup, of which 26 were laid down and 24 actually commissioned.

Design

In drawing up the preliminary design for Essex, particular attention was directed at the size of both the flight and hangar decks. Aircraft design had come a long way from the comparatively light planes used in carriers during the 1930s. Flight decks now required more takeoff space for the heavier aircraft being developed. Moreover, US carrier doctrine was premised on the "deck-load strike", launching as rapidly as possible as many aircraft as could be spotted on the flight deck beforehand. Most of the first-line carriers of the pre-war years were equipped with flush deck catapults, but, owing to the speed and size of these ships, very little catapulting was done except for experimental purposes.

With the advent of war, airplane weights began to go up as armor and armament got heavier; aircrew complements also increased. By the war's end in 1945, catapult launches would become more common under these circumstances, with some carrier commanding officers reporting up to 40% of launches by catapult.

The hangar area design came in for many design conferences between the naval bureaus. Not only were the supporting structures to the flight deck required to carry the increased weight of landing and parked aircraft, but they were to have sufficient strength to support the storing of spare fuselages and parts (50% of each operational plane type aboard, hence 33% of carried aircraft) under the flight deck and still provide adequate working space for the men using the area below.

One innovation in Essex was a portside deck-edge elevator in addition to two inboard elevators. Experiments had also been made with hauling aircraft by crane up a ramp between the hangar and flight decks, but this method proved too slow. The Navy's Bureau of Ships and the chief engineer of A.B.C. Elevator Co. designed the engine for the side elevator. It was a standard elevator,  in platform surface, which traveled vertically on the port side of the ship. There would be no large hole in the flight deck when the elevator was in the "down" position, a critical factor if the elevator ever became inoperable during combat operations. Its new position made it easier to continue normal operations on deck, irrespective of the position of the elevator. The elevator also increased the effective deck space when it was in the "up" position by providing additional parking room outside the normal contours of the flight deck, and increased the effective area on the hangar deck by the absence of elevator pits. In addition, its machinery was less complex than the two inboard elevators, requiring about 20% fewer man-hours of maintenance.

Ongoing improvements to the class were made, particularly with regard to the ventilation system, lighting systems, and the trash burner design and implementation.

These carriers had better armor protection than their predecessors, better facilities for handling ammunition, safer and greater fueling capacity, and more effective damage control equipment. Yet, these ships were also designed to limit weight and the complexity of construction, for instance incorporating extensive use of flat and straight metal pieces, and of Special Treatment Steel (STS), a nickel-chrome steel alloy that provided the same protective qualities as Class B armor plate, but which was fully structural rather than deadweight.

The original design for the class assumed a complement of 215 officers and 2,171 enlisted men. However, by the end of World War II, most crews were 50% larger than that.

The tactical employment of U.S. carriers changed as the war progressed. In early operations, through 1942, the doctrine was to operate singly or in pairs, joining together for the offense and separating when on the defense—the theory being that a separation of carriers under attack not only provided a protective screen for each, but also dispersed the targets and divided the enemy's attack. Combat experience in those early operations did not bear out the theory, and new proposals for tactical deployment were the subject of much discussion.

As the new Essex- and -class carriers became available, tactics changed. Experience taught the wisdom of combined strength. Under attack, the combined anti-aircraft fire of a task group's carriers and their screen provided a more effective umbrella of protection against marauding enemy aircraft than was possible when the carriers separated.

When two or more of these task groups supported each other, they constituted a fast carrier task force. Lessons learned from operating the carriers as a single group of six, as two groups of three, and three groups of two, provided the basis for many tactics that later characterized carrier task force operations, with the evolution of the fast carrier task force and its successful employment in future operations.

Armaments

Air group
The original aircraft complement, nicknamed the "Sunday Punch", was the pride of the carrier and consisted of the offensive power of 36 fighters, 36 dive bombers, and 18 torpedo bombers. The Grumman F6F Hellcat would be the standard fighter, the Curtiss SB2C Helldiver the standard scout aircraft and dive bomber, and the Grumman TBF Avenger as the torpedo bomber, but also often used in other attack roles. In the last year of the Pacific War, all of the carrier-based combat aircraft could mount several 5-inch High Velocity Aircraft Rockets (HVARs), which greatly improved their effectiveness against ground targets.

Guns, radar and radios
The defensive plan was to use radio and radar in a combined effort to concentrate anti-aircraft fire.

The class as designed mounted twelve 5 in (127 mm) 38 caliber gun mounts (4 enclosed twin mounts located near the island on the starboard side and 4 single open mounts located on the port side forward and port side aft), these guns had a maximum range of seven miles and a rate of fire of fifteen rounds per minute.  The 5-inch guns could fire VT shells, known as proximity fuzed-shells, that would detonate when they came close to an enemy aircraft. The 5-inch guns could also aim into the water, creating waterspouts which could bring down low flying aircraft such as torpedo planes. 

In addition there were seventeen quadruple Bofors 40 mm anti-aircraft guns and 65 single Oerlikon 20 mm cannon. The Bofors 40 mm guns were a significant improvement over the 1.1 in/75 caliber guns mounted in the earlier  and  classes.

The Essex class also made use of the latest technology and communications equipment. All units were commissioned with SK air-search and SC and SG surface-search radars. Several of the class received SM fighter-direction radar. Two Mark 37 fire control directors fitted with FD Mark 4 tracking radar for the 5"/38 battery were installed; the Mk4 proved inadequate at distinguishing low-level intruders from surface clutter and was quickly replaced with the improved Mark 12/Mark 22 combination. 40mm AA batteries were controlled by Mark 51 optical directors with integrated gyro gun-sight lead-angle calculators. A Plan Position Indicator (PPI) display was used to keep track of ships and enabled a multi-carrier force to maintain a high-speed formation at night or in foul weather. The new navigational tool known as the Dead Reckoning Tracer was also implemented for navigation and tracking of surface ships. Identification Friend or Foe (IFF) was used to identify hostile ships and aircraft, especially at night or in adverse weather. The four-channel Very High Frequency (VHF) radio permitted channel variation in an effort to prevent enemy interception of transmissions. It also allowed for simultaneous radio contact with other ships and planes in the task force.

Essex "long-hull" (Ticonderoga subclass)

Beginning in March 1943, one visually very significant change was authorized for ships then in the early stages of construction. This involved lengthening the bow above the waterline into a "clipper" form. The increased rake and flare provided deck space for an additional quadruple 40 mm mount; these units also had the flight deck slightly shortened forward to provide better arcs of fire. Of the Essex-class ships laid down after 1942, only  followed the original "short bow" design. The later ships have been variously referred to as the "long-bow units", the "long-hull group", or the "Ticonderoga class". However, the U.S. Navy never maintained any institutional distinction between the long-hull and short-hull members of the Essex class, and postwar refits and upgrades were applied to both groups equally. Less immediately visible aspects of the March 1943 design modification included safer ventilation and aviation-fuel systems, moving the combat information center below the armored deck, the addition of a second flight-deck catapult, the elimination of the hangar deck catapult, and a third Mk 37 fire-control director; some of these changes were also made to short-bow ships nearing completion or as they returned to the yards.

Modifications were made throughout the Essex building program. The number of 20 mm and 40 mm anti-aircraft guns was greatly increased, new and improved radars were added, the original hangar deck catapult was removed, the ventilation system was substantially revised, details of protection were altered, and hundreds of other large and small changes were executed. In the meantime, earlier ships were continually modified as they returned to the yard for repair and overhaul. For example, one of the first to be commissioned, by the end of the war had received two H-4B flight deck catapults in place of her original single H-4A; three quad 40 mm mounts below the island to starboard, three more on the port side and one additional on both the starboard quarter and the stern; twenty-one additional 20 mm mounts; SM fighter-control radar; FD Mk 4 radar replaced with Mk 12/22; and an enlarged flag bridge. In fact, to the skilled observer, no two ships of the class looked exactly the same.

Post-war rebuilds

The large numbers of new ships, coupled with their larger  contemporaries, sustained the Navy's air power through the rest of the 1940s, the Korean War era, and beyond. While the spacious hangars accommodated the introduction of jets, various modifications significantly improved the capability of fifteen of the ships to handle the jets' increased weight and speed. Among these modification were jet-blast deflectors (JBDs), greater aviation fuel capacity, stronger decks and elevators. Also included were the British innovations of an optical landing system, steam catapults and, ultimately, an angled flight deck.

All of the short-hulls were laid up in 1946–47 along with five of the long-hulls. Eight of the last nine ships completed stayed on active duty to form, with three Midways, the backbone of the post-war Navy's combat strength. Though the Truman administration's defense economies sent three of the active Essexes into "mothballs" in 1949, these soon came back into commission after the Korean War began. Ultimately, all but two short-hulls and all thirteen long-hulls had active Cold War service.

, which had been left unfinished at the end of the war, was completed to an improved design between August 1948 and September 1950, with a much stronger (straight) flight deck and a reconfigured island. Eight earlier ships were thoroughly rebuilt to the Oriskany design under the SCB-27A program in the early 1950s. Six more of the earlier ships were rebuilt to an improved 27C design as the last stage of the SCB-27 program; these ships received steam catapults instead of the less powerful hydraulic units. The otherwise unmodified  received an experimental 10.5-degree angled deck in 1952. An angled flight deck and enclosed hurricane bow became the distinctive features of the SCB-125 program, which was undertaken concurrently with the last three 27C conversions and later applied to all 27A and 27C ships except .  became the first operational United States angled deck aircraft carrier in 1955. Oriskany, the first of the modernized ships but the last angled-deck conversion, received a unique SCB-125A refit which upgraded her to 27C standard, and included steam catapults and an aluminum flight deck.

Korean War and subsequent Cold War needs ensured twenty-two of the twenty-four ships had extensive post–World War II service ( and  had suffered heavy damage and were never recommissioned). All initially carried attack air groups; however by 1955 seven unconverted Essexes were operating under the anti-submarine warfare carrier (CVS) designation established in August 1953. As the  "supercarriers" entered the fleet, the eight 27A conversions were designated CVS to replace the original unconverted ships; the latter began to leave active service in the late 1950s. Two 27C conversions were designated CVS in 1962 (although CVS-11  would operate as an attack carrier off Vietnam) and two more in 1969. The seven angle-deck 27As and one 27C received specialized CVS modifications including bow-mounted SQS-23 sonar under the SCB-144 program in the early 1960s. The updated units remained active until age and the growing number of supercarriers made them obsolete, from the late 1960s into the middle 1970s. However, one of the first of the type, served until 1991 as a training ship. Four of the modernized ships (Yorktown, Intrepid, Hornet, and Lexington) have been preserved as museums; the remainder were scrapped starting in the 1970s save Oriskany, which the Navy contemplated reactivating in the 1980s and which was eventually scuttled as an artificial reef off the Florida coast in 2006.

The remainder decommissioned in the late 1950s and early 1960s and were promptly reclassified as aircraft transports (AVT), reflecting their very limited ability to operate modern aircraft safely. An unmodernised Essex was offered to the Royal Australian Navy in 1960 as a replacement for  but the offer was declined due to the expense of modifications required to make it operationally compatible with the RAN's primarily British-designed fleet. All were scrapped, most in the 1970s.

Evolution of the air wing
For a typical attack carrier (CVA) configuration in 1956–57 aboard , the air wing consisted of one squadron each of the following: FJ-3 Furies, F2H Banshees, F9F Cougars, AD-6, AD-5N, and AD-5W Skyraiders, AJ-2 Savages, and F9F-8P photo Cougars.

By the mid-to-late 1960s, the attack air wing had evolved. Oriskany deployed with two squadrons of F-8J Crusaders, three squadrons of A-4E Skyhawks, E-1 Tracers, EKA-3B Skywarriors, and RF-8G photo Crusaders. In 1970, the three A-4 squadrons were replaced by two squadrons of A-7A Corsair IIs. The F-4 Phantom II and A-6 Intruder were considered too heavy to operate from the Essex-class.

Tasked and fitted out as an ASW carrier (CVS), the air wing of an Essex such as Bennington in the 1960s consisted of two squadrons of S2F Trackers and one squadron of SH-34 Seabat ASW helicopters (replaced in 1964 by SH-3A Sea Kings). Airborne early warning was first provided by modified EA-1Es; these were upgraded in 1965 to E-1Bs. A small detachment of A-4Bs or A-4Cs (4 aircraft) were also embarked to provide daylight fighter protection for the ASW aircraft.

Landing platform helicopter–converted ships such as Boxer never had an angled landing deck installed and flew only helicopters such as the UH-34 Seahorse and CH-46 Sea Knight. Four converted Essex-class ships served alongside the purpose built s providing floating helicopter bases for US Marines. The LPHs were sometimes also used as aircraft ferries for all branches of the U.S. armed forces. The AV-8A arrived into Marine Corps inventory too late to see regular fixed wing operations return to these ships. It was possible to launch and recover small aircraft like the OV-10 Bronco without need of catapult or arresting wires, but this was very rarely permitted on these straight-deck ships for safety reasons and to avoid interruption of helicopter operations.

Military contributions
One author called the Essex class "the most significant class of warships in American naval history", citing the large number produced and "their role in making the aircraft carrier the backbone of the U.S. Navy."

Essex-class ships played a central role in the Pacific theater of World War II from 1943 through the end of the war, beginning with raids in the central Pacific and the invasion of Tarawa in the Gilbert Islands. The ships successfully performed a number of missions, included air superiority, attacking the Japanese fleet, supporting landings, fleet protection, bombing the Japanese home islands, and transporting aircraft and troops. Along the way, the carriers survived bombs, torpedoes, kamikazes, and typhoons without one ship being sunk.

Eleven of the Essex carriers participated in the Korean War. These ships played a major role throughout the entire war. Missions included attacks on all types of ground targets, air superiority, and antisubmarine patrols.

Thirteen of the twenty-four carriers originally built participated in the Vietnam War, including the prelude and follow-up. However, their inability to support the latest aircraft constrained some of those ships to specialized roles as helicopter carriers or antisubmarine platforms. The ships still performing an attack mission generally carried older aircraft types than the supercarriers. Yet, the Essex class still made significant contributions to all aspects of the U.S. war effort. In one notable event, during the Gulf of Tonkin Incident, aircraft from Ticonderoga fired at North Vietnamese torpedo boats that had attacked a U.S. destroyer.

The carriers also contributed between the wars, projecting U.S. power around the world and performing antisubmarine patrols. When the Cold War heated up, the Essex carriers were often involved, including Quemoy and the Matsu Islands, the Bay of Pigs Invasion, and the Cuban Missile Crisis. Also, from 1957 through 1991 an Essex-class ship served as the Navy's training carrier—Antietam from 1957 through 1962 and Lexington for the remainder of the time.

Space program
Several Essex-class ships played a part in the United States' human spaceflight program, as recovery ships for unmanned and manned spaceflights, between 1960 and 1973.

USS Valley Forge was the recovery ship for the unmanned flight of Mercury-Redstone 1A on 19 December 1960. The first spaceflight by an American was on Mercury-Redstone 3 (Freedom 7), recovered by Lake Champlain on 5 May 1961.  recovered the next flight, Mercury-Redstone 4 (Liberty Bell 7), on 21 July 1961, and she was the primary recovery ship for Mercury-Atlas 6 (Friendship 7), the first orbital flight by an American. The next manned flight, Mercury-Atlas 7 (Aurora 7), was picked up by Intrepid on 24 May 1962, and  recovered the last two Mercury spacecraft, Mercury-Atlas 8 (Sigma 7), on 3 October 1962, and Mercury-Atlas 9 (Faith 7), on 16 May 1963.

When the Mercury program's successor, Project Gemini, got underway, Essexes were again closely involved. Lake Champlain recovered the second unmanned flight, Gemini 2, on 19 January 1965; and Intrepid recovered the first manned flight, Gemini 3. Wasp recovered the crew of Gemini IV on 7 June, and on 29 August, Lake Champlain picked up Gemini 5 after eight days in space. In December 1965, Wasp made history by picking up two spacecraft in just over two days: Gemini VI-A on 16 December, and Gemini 7 on 18 December, after their orbital rendezvous test flight. She also recovered Gemini 9A on 6 June 1966 and the final Gemini spaceflight, Gemini 12 on 15 November.

The successful use of the carriers as recovery ships continued into the Apollo program. On 26 February 1966, Boxer recovered the command module from AS-201, the first unmanned flight of a production Apollo Command and Service Module. AS-202, another sub-orbital test flight of the command module, was recovered in August by Hornet; the command module from that flight is currently on display aboard Hornet. Bennington recovered the command module of Apollo 4, the first unmanned flight of the Saturn V launch vehicle, on 9 November 1967.

Eleven months later, Essex recovered the astronauts of Apollo 7, the first manned mission in the Apollo program, after eleven days in orbit. Yorktown recovered the astronauts of Apollo 8, after their historic flight around the Moon in December 1968;  and Princeton recovered the second crew to orbit the Moon, aboard Apollo 10, in May 1969.

Hornet rejoined the program and recovered the astronauts from the first two moon landing missions, Apollo 11 in July 1969 and Apollo 12 in November. The first steps on Earth of returning astronauts Neil Armstrong, Buzz Aldrin, and Mike Collins, are marked on her hangar deck, as part of her Apollo program exhibit. The three subsequent missions utilized amphibious assault ships as support vessels; however, Ticonderoga recovered the astronauts of the last two moon missions, Apollo 16 and Apollo 17 in April and December 1972.

In the post-Apollo era, Ticonderoga again acted as a recovery ship for the astronauts of Skylab 2, the first manned mission to Skylab, the first U.S. orbital space station, in June 1973.

Remaining ships
Four Essex-class ships have been preserved, and opened to the public as museums:
 Yorktown, at Patriot's Point, Mount Pleasant, South Carolina
 Intrepid, in New York City
 Hornet, in Alameda, California
 Lexington, at Corpus Christi, Texas.

Until  opened at San Diego, every preserved aircraft carrier in the U.S. was an Essex.

Oriskany was scuttled in 2006 to form an artificial reef off the coast of Pensacola, Florida, and can be visited by experienced divers.

Ships in class

Construction notes:

Reprisal, laid down in July 1944 at the New York Navy Yard and launched in 1945, had her construction cancelled on 12 August 1945 due to the cessation of hostilities when the ship was about half complete. She was scrapped incomplete after tests.  was laid down at Newport News Shipbuilding yards in January 1945, but was cancelled in August 1945 for the same reasons. She was broken up on the slipway.

Six fiscal-year 1945 ships, none of which received names, were assigned to Fore River (CV-50), Brooklyn Navy Yard (CV-51 and CV-52), Philadelphia Navy Yard (CV-53) and Norfolk Navy Yard (CV-54 and CV-55). Their construction was canceled in March 1945.

 was ordered and laid down as an Essex-class vessel, was completed in 1950 to the much modified SCB-27 design, and from commissioning until her reconstruction 1957–59 was listed as the lead ship of the separate Oriskany class.

Later class assignments
Successive rebuildings and changing roles meant that the original unitary Essex class became divided by the Navy into several classes, which went through many shifts and re-namings. According to the United States Naval Vessel Register the final class assignments were
 CVS-10 Yorktown class (SCB-27A): Essex, Yorktown, Hornet, Randolph, Wasp, Bennington, Kearsarge, Lake Champlain
 CVS-11 Intrepid class (SCB-27C + SCB-144): Intrepid
 CVA-19 Hancock class (SCB-27C): Ticonderoga, Hancock, Bon Homme Richard, Oriskany, Shangri-La
 AVT-8 Franklin class (unreconstructed ships): Franklin, Bunker Hill, Leyte, Antietam, Tarawa, Philippine Sea
 AVT-16 Lexington class (training carrier): Lexington
 LPH-4 Boxer class (helicopter assault conversions): Boxer, Princeton, Valley Forge

See also

 List of ship classes of the Second World War

Notes

References
 
 
 
 
 
 
  .
 
 

 

Aircraft carrier classes
 
 Essex-class aircraft carriers
 Essex-class aircraft carriers
 Essex-class aircraft carriers
 Essex-class aircraft carriers